John Scott Gaisford (born 7 October 1934) is a British retired Anglican bishop. He was the second Bishop of Beverley, the first appointed to be a provincial episcopal visitor ("flying bishop") for the Province of York when the Church of England began ordaining women as priests.

Education and ministry
Gaisford was educated at Durham University, made a deacon at Michaelmas 1960 (25 September) and ordained a priest the Michaelmas following (24 September 1961) — both times by William Greer, Bishop of Manchester, at Manchester Cathedral — and began his ordained ministry with a  curacy at St Hilda's Audenshaw.  from 1960 to 1962. Following this he was curate at St Michael and All Angels in Bramhall, Cheshire until 1965 when he became vicar of St Andrew's Crewe and was Rural Dean of Nantwich from 1974 until 1985  and then Archdeacon of Macclesfield until 1994. He was consecrated a bishop on 7 March 1994, by John Habgood, Archbishop of York, at York Minster; and retired in 2000.

References

1934 births
20th-century Church of England bishops
Anglican suffragan bishops of Beverley
Archdeacons of Macclesfield
Living people
Alumni of St Chad's College, Durham